The 2023 Shelbourne F.C. (women) season sees Shelbourne looking to win the Women's National League title for a third successive season.

First team squad

 Players' ages are as of the opening day of the 2023 season.

Transfers

Transfers in

Transfers out

Competitions

Overview

Women's National League

Results summary

Results by matchday

Matches

FAI Cup

UEFA Women's Champions League

Presidents Cup

Statistics

Appearances and goals

 Players listed in italics left the club mid-season
Source: RedsStats1895

Goalscorers 
As of match played 11 March 2023

Players listed in italics left the club mid-season
Source: RedsStats1985

Kit

The 2023 Home and Away shirts were released on 17 December 2022. Culligan replaces Hampton Homes as front of shirt sponsor in a deal running until the end of 2026. 

|
|

References

External links

Shelbourne F.C. seasons